The Democratic Constitutional Rally or Democratic Constitutional Assembly (sometimes also called Constitutional Democratic Rally in English), also referred to by its French initials RCD, formerly called Neo Destour then Socialist Destourian Party, was the ruling party in Tunisia from independence in 1956 until it was overthrown and dissolved in the Tunisian revolution in 2011.

History and profile
In 1920, Tunisian nationalists formed the Destour (Constitutional) Party in opposition to French rule. As the party developed, a schism occurred within the party, leading to the founding of the Neo Destour Party in 1934 by Habib Bourguiba and several younger members of the old Destour. Under his leadership, the Neo Destour Party successfully garnered independence from France in 1956. As it was, for all intents and purposes, the only well-organized party in the country, it swept the Constituent Assembly elections held later that year. A year later, Tunisia was declared a republic with Bourguiba as first president.

In 1963, the Neo Destour was formally declared the only legally permitted party in Tunisia, though for all intents and purposes, party and state had been one since independence. In 1964, the Neo Destour Party became the Destourian Socialist Party (PSD).

Opposition parties were legalized once again in 1981. From then on, the PSD faced opposition from Hizb ut-Tahrir, the Islamic Tendency Movement, the Tunisian Communist Party, the Movement for Popular Unity and student groups. Although its influence was slightly weakened, the RCD still effectively ruled Tunisia as a one-party state; it continued to sweep all elections to the legislature until 1994.

On 7 November 1987, Zine el-Abidine Ben Ali, who had been named Prime Minister only a month earlier, became president after Bourguiba was declared medically unfit for office. The following year, President Ben Ali instituted economic reforms increasing economic privatization and renamed the party the Democratic Constitutional Rally (RCD). Ben Ali did not face an opponent for reelection until 1999, but even then was reelected by implausibly high margins. While opposition parties finally managed to enter the legislature for the first time in 1994, they never won more than 24 percent of the seats, and there was little meaningful opposition to presidential decisions. For all intents and purposes, the RCD continued to hold complete political control over the country.

In the 2009 general election, the last held before the revolution, the RCD won 161 of 214 seats with the remaining 53 seats going to minority parties. Ben Ali was elected to a fifth full term with 89.6 percent of the vote. These elections, like virtually all others in the country since independence, were widely seen as fraudulent. The outcry over the elections proved to be a major cause of the revolution which forced Ben Ali to resign and flee into exile.

In response to the RCD's attempt to suppress the protests, the Socialist International expelled the RCD on 17 January 2011—three days after Ben Ali fled the country. In order to placate protesters and designated coalition participants, the incumbent president and prime minister resigned from their memberships in the RCD on 18 January and all remaining RCD-aligned ministers resigned their party memberships on 20 January, the effect of which left the RCD with only a parliamentary majority. On 27 January, Prime Minister Mohamed Ghannouchi carried out a major reshuffle, removing all former RCD members other than himself from the government.

The interior ministry suspended the party's operations on 6 February, a little less than a month after Ben Ali fled into exile. On 9 March, the party was dissolved by the Tunisian courts.

Leaders
Habib Bourguiba (1934–1987) (Leader of Neo Destour Party: 1934–1964; Leader of Socialist Destourian Party: 1964–1987)
Zine El Abidine Ben Ali (1987–2011) (Leader of Socialist Destourian Party: 1987–1988)
Mohamed Ghannouchi (2011)

Congresses
 29–31 July 1993
 29–31 July 1998
 30 August – 2 September 1998
 28–31 July 2003

Electoral history

Presidential elections

Chamber of Deputies elections

See also 
:Category:Democratic Constitutional Rally politicians
Destour
Neo Destour
Socialist Destourian Party

References

1988 establishments in Tunisia
2011 disestablishments in Tunisia
Banned political parties in Tunisia
Defunct political parties in Tunisia
Destourian parties
Former member parties of the Socialist International
Organizations of the Arab Spring
Political parties disestablished in 2011
Political parties established in 1988
Secularism in Tunisia
Tunisian Revolution